Walter Davies may refer to:

 Walter Davies (politician), British Liberal Party politician
 Walter Davies (footballer), Welsh international footballer
 Walter Davies, commonly known by his bardic name Gwallter Mechain, Welsh poet, editor, translator, antiquary and Anglican clergyman
 Walter C. Davies,  pen-name used by Cyril M. Kornbluth, American science fiction author

See also
Walter Davis (disambiguation)